Rawley may refer to:

Surname:
Eva Rawley, fictional character in the American situation comedy TV series 227 aired on NBC, 1985–1990
Judy Crawford Rawley (born 1951), retired Canadian alpine skier who competed at the 1972 Winter Olympics
Mojo Rawley (born 1986), American professional wrestler
Shane Rawley (born 1955), former Major League Baseball pitcher
The Honourable Mr Justice Stephen Rawley, fictional character in the television series Porridge
William Rawley, the chaplain of major 17th-century English figures, including Francis Bacon, King Charles I, and King Charles II

Given name:
Rawley Silver, American art therapist, artist, author, and educator

Geography:
Rawley House, historic home located at Leipsic, Kent County, Delaware
Rawley Point Light, a lighthouse in Point Beach State Forest, near Two Rivers, Wisconsin
Rawley Springs, Virginia, unincorporated community in Rockingham County, Virginia. USA

See also
 James A. Rawley Prize (AHA), a history prize awarded by the American Historical Association (AHA) for the best book in Atlantic history
 James A. Rawley Prize (OAH), a history prize awarded by the  Organization of American Historians (OAH) for the best book on race relations in the United States
Brawley (disambiguation)
Crawley
Frawley
Rawle (disambiguation)
Rawnsley
Shrawley